Family with sequence similarity 177 member A1 (FAM177A1) is a protein that in humans is encoded by the FAM177A1 gene, previously known as C14orf24. The other member of this family is FAM177B.

Function 
FAM177A1 has been linked to immune system regulation and to neurogenesis.

Interactions 

IntAct reports physical interactions between FAM117A1 and these other human proteins:

 Aquaporin-6
 Caspase 6
 DPM3
 ELOVL4
 FATE1
 JAGN1
 LAMP2
 PBX3
 SGPL1
 SH3GLB1
 TMX2

References

External links 

 FAM177A1 Research Fund (for FAM177A1 Associated Disease)